Attilio Tesser (born 10 June 1958) is an Italian association football manager and former defender, who is currently the head coach of Modena.

Playing career 
Tesser, a defender, started his playing career with Treviso. He moved to Napoli in 1978, where he played two seasons. He then played for Udinese from 1980 to 1985, and then for some lower league teams, including Perugia and Catania. He was also capped for the Italian U-21 side.

Managing career 
After his retirement, Tesser began a coaching career in 1992 for Serie D side Sevegliano, and successively became a coach at the youth level for Udinese and Venezia. His first professional coaching job came in 2001, for Serie C2 side F.C. Südtirol. In 2003, he replaced Ezio Rossi at the helm of U.S. Triestina Calcio of Serie B. After a very good season, followed by a poorer one, Tesser moved to Cagliari Calcio of Serie A in 2006, but was fired just after the first league match by team chairman Massimo Cellino. In July 2006 he was named coach of Ascoli, replacing Marco Giampaolo. However, after a serie of struggling results ended in a 1–0 home defeat to Empoli F.C. in the 11th matchday, Tesser was fired and replaced by Nedo Sonetti.

Tesser started the 2007–08 season at the helm of Serie B side Mantova, with the aim to fight for a promotion spot; however, results did not confirm the initial goals, and he was sacked on 24 February 2008, leaving Mantova in seventh place, seven points far from the fourth playoff spot.

In January 2009 he accepted a coaching offer from Lega Pro Prima Divisione club Padova; however, his stint with the patavini lasted only one month, as he was sacked later on February.

In June 2009 he was named Novara manager. His tenure proved to be highly successful, as he led his club to become Lega Pro Prima Divisione champions in his first season in charge. In the 2010–11 season, Tesser repeated himself as he guided Novara to third place in the final table, then winning a second consecutive promotion to Serie A after defeating Reggina and Padova in the playoffs. The Serie A comeback however proved to be particularly difficult for Novara, who only won 12 points after the first 20 games: this cost Tesser the job, as he was removed from his managerial duties on 30 January 2012 following a 2–0 away loss against Palermo; he was replaced by veteran coach Emiliano Mondonico. On 6 March 2012 he was recalled by Novara as head coach, but on 31 October 2012 he was again sacked.

On 13 June 2015 Tesser was appointed as the head coach of Avellino, replacing Massimo Rastelli.

In the summer of 2016 he was hired by the Cremonese. He was dismissed from Cremonese on 23 April 2018.

On 4 July 2018 Tesser has been appointed as the new head coach of Pordenone Calcio. On his first season as Pordenone boss, he guided the small Friuli club to direct promotion to Serie B (the first in club history) as Serie C/B champions.

He was fired on 3 April 2021 after a 1–4 loss to Brescia that left Pordenone two points shy of relegation.

Tesser was subsequently named new head coach of ambitious Serie C club Modena for the 2021–22 season; under his guidance, the Canarini won the Group B title by the end of the campaign, thus ensuring themselves promotion to Serie B for the following season.

Managerial statistics

Honours

Managerial
 Novara
 Lega Pro Prima Divisione: 2009–10
 Supercoppa Lega Pro: 2010
 Cremonese
 Lega Pro: 2016–17
 Pordenone
 Serie C: 2018–19
 Supercoppa di Serie C: 2019
 Modena
 Serie C: 2021–22

Individual
 Panchina d'Argento: 2010–11

References

External links

1958 births
Living people
People from Montebelluna
Italian footballers
Italy under-21 international footballers
Serie A players
Serie B players
Treviso F.B.C. 1993 players
S.S.C. Napoli players
Udinese Calcio players
A.C. Perugia Calcio players
Catania S.S.D. players
Serie A managers
Ascoli Calcio 1898 F.C. managers
Cagliari Calcio managers
Mantova 1911 managers
U.S. Triestina Calcio 1918 managers
Calcio Padova managers
Association football defenders
Italian football managers
Calcio Montebelluna players
F.C. Südtirol managers
U.S. Cremonese managers
A.S.D. Sevegliano managers
Sportspeople from the Province of Treviso
Footballers from Veneto